Sue Biggins (born 1968) is an American cell biologist who studies kinetochores and the transfer of chromosomes during cell division. Her team isolated kinetochores from cells, enabling them to be studied separately under laboratory conditions. They also discovered that tension helps kinetochores to attach to microtubules and move from the mother cell to the daughter cells when cells divide. The methodology and concepts she developed for yeast kinetochores are being adopted in laboratories around the world.
Biggins was elected to the American Academy of Arts & Sciences (AAAS) in 2018.

Education
Biggins received her BS in biology in 1990 from Stanford University and her Ph.D. in Molecular Biology in 1995 at Princeton University.

Career
Biggins is currently the associate director and a full member of the basic sciences division at Fred Hutchinson Cancer Research Center as well as an affiliate professor for the department of biochemistry at the University of Washington.

She was elected to the National Academy of Sciences in 2015 and to the American Academy of Arts & Sciences in 2018. 
She received the National Academy of Sciences Award in Molecular Biology in 2013.

Biggins has also received a Beckman Young Investigators Award  in 2003. 
Biggins is also a Howard Hughes Medical Institute Investigator. 
She was awarded the Novitski Prize of the Genetics Society of America in 2015.

References 

Members of the United States National Academy of Sciences
Cancer researchers
Princeton University alumni
Stanford University alumni
Living people
1968 births
Fred Hutchinson Cancer Research Center people